Lotte Hotels and Resorts is a South Korean luxury hotel chain operated by Lotte Hotel Co., Ltd., the hospitality arm of Lotte Corporation. The company was founded in May 1973. Starting with the opening of Lotte Hotel Seoul in 1979, luxury chain hotels opened in Jamsil, Busan, Jeju, and Ulsan. The first business hotel, Lotte City Hotel Mapo, opened in April 2009, and the first overseas chain, Lotte Hotel Moscow, opened in June 2010. On December 8, 2011, the second business hotel, Lotte City Hotel Gimpo Airport opened within the Lotte Mall Gimpo Airport complex.

History 
Lotte Group was originally established in Japan and expanded into South Korea with the establishment of Lotte Confectionery Co., Ltd in 1967. Lotte Group consists of over 60 business units in such diverse industries as candy manufacturing, beverages, hotels, fast food, retail, financial services, heavy chemicals, electronics, IT, construction, publishing, and entertainment.

Lotte Hotels & Resorts was founded in 1973 with the opening of first hotel of the chain Lotte Hotel Seoul, located in Jung-gu. It features the Royal Suite, which is 460 square meters large.

The company expanded its business in 1988 and opened Lotte Hotel World, a recreational complex which consists of a large indoor theme park, an outdoor amusement park, an island linked by monorail, shopping malls, a hotel, a Korean folk museum, sports facilities, and movie theatres in one area.

The third hotel, Lotte Hotel Busan was opened in 1997 in Busan, South Korea's second largest metropolis after Seoul and its largest port city.

Lotte Hotel Jeju was opened in 2000 on Jeju Island, which has a temperate climate, natural scenery, and beaches. Jeju is a popular tourist destination for South Koreans as well as visitors from other parts of East Asia. Two years later the chain opened Lotte Hotel Ulsan.

The sixth hotel Lotte City Hotel Mapo was opened in 2009 in Mapo, Seoul's district. This "city hotel" caters to business travelers. There is also a sister hotel in Tokyo, Japan (Lotte City Hotel Kinshicho).

The first chain hotel abroad, Lotte Hotel Moscow, was opened in Russia in 2010.

Lotte City Hotel Gimpo Airport was opened in Banghwa-dong, Gangseo-gu, Seoul, on December 8, 2011. The hotel is situated within the Lotte Mall Gimpo Airport complex. The 8-story building houses 197 rooms, 1 buffet restaurant, banquet halls, business conference rooms, fitness center, and coin laundry.

Properties 

 
 Signiel 
Signiel Seoul
Signiel Busan
Lotte Hotel
Lotte Hotel Seoul
Lotte Hotel Busan
Lotte Hotel World
Lotte Hotel Jeju
Lotte Hotel Ulsan
L7
L7 Myeongdong
L7 Gangnam
L7 Hongdae
Lotte City Hotel
Lotte City Hotel Mapo
Lotte City Hotel Gimpo Airport
Lotte City Hotel Guro
Lotte City Hotel Myeongdong
Lotte City Hotel Jeju
Lotte City Hotel Ulsan
Lotte City Hotel Daejeon
Lotte Resort 
Lotte Resort Jeju Art Villas
Lotte Resort Sokcho
Lotte Resort Buyeo 
 
Lotte Hotel Moscow
Lotte Hotel St. Petersburg
Lotte Hotel Vladivostok
Lotte Hotel Samara 
 
Lotte New York Palace
Lotte Hotel Seattle  
Lotte Hotel Guam 
 
Lotte Arai Resort
Lotte City Hotel Kinshicho
 
Lotte Hotel Saigon
Lotte Hotel Hanoi
 
Lotte Hotel Yangon
 
Lotte City Hotel Tashkent Palace

References

External links 
 

Lotte Corporation
Hotels and Resorts
Companies based in Seoul
Hotels established in 1973
Hotel chains in South Korea
South Korean brands
South Korean companies established in 1973